The Kolkata Vipers are a professional American football team based in Kolkata, India. The Vipers are one of the first eight franchises of the Elite Football League of India (EFLI) and compete in its inaugural season in 2012 as a member of the East Division.

References

Elite Football League of India
American football teams in India
American football teams established in 2011
Sport in Kolkata
2011 establishments in West Bengal